Wuyi Square may refer to:

 Wuyi Square (Changsha)
 Wuyi Square Station, Changsha Metro
 Wuyi Square (Fuzhou)
 Wuyi Square (Taiyuan)